Laurent Dufresne (born 2 March 1972) is a French former professional footballer who played as a striker. He is the former team captain of Valenciennes FC (the title was passed on to Éric Chelle). Over his entire career, which started in 1992, he scored over 100 goals in over 300 appearances.

Career

Early career
Dufresne first played professionally in 1992 when for the Valenciennes FC. He spent a full five years there before he was transferred.

Châteauroux
Dufresne spent four years at Châteauroux, from the start of 1997 to 2001. He made his most appearances and scored the most goals at the club.

Nancy
Dufresne spent four years at AS Nancy. From the 2001 season to the 2005 season, he proved to be an invaluable striker, with an average of one goal per three games.

Return to Valenciennes
The 2005–06 season saw Dufresne return to Valenciennes FC, where he had first started his professional football career. He became team captain of the group leading the club to the French Second Division championship and French First Division promotion.

He returned to Châteauroux in 2007 before retiring the following year.

External links

1972 births
Living people
French footballers
Association football forwards
Ligue 1 players
Ligue 2 players
Valenciennes FC players
LB Châteauroux players
AS Nancy Lorraine players